Benagues is a commune in the Ariège department of southwestern France.

Population 
The Inhabitants of the Commune are known as Bénaguais.

See also
Communes of the Ariège department

References

Communes of Ariège (department)
Ariège communes articles needing translation from French Wikipedia